Steph Song  is a Malaysian actress of Chinese heritage, raised in Saskatoon, Saskatchewan, Canada and Australia. She was voted sexiest woman in the world by Asian readers of FHM magazine. Song has received five Leo Award nominations and one Gemini Award nomination for her TV and film work in Canada and the United States.

Career
Song acted mostly on a freelance basis in Singapore in her early career, and was the female lead in the second season of Heartlanders, as well as the first season of Achar!, which won Bronze Medal at the New York Television Awards and has since been sold to 10 countries. Another show that Steph was in, titled Singapore Short Story Project, won best Drama Series at the Asian Television Awards in 2004.

In 2004, Song joined SPH MediaWorks, and was supporting lead in "Perceptions" and female lead in the very last Channel i-produced drama Six Weeks which won Best Drama Series at the Asian Television Awards 2005. When MediaWorks merged with MediaCorp later that year, Song did not move over to MediaCorp choosing instead to move to North America, where she found success, nominated 6 times in the last five years for her work as female lead actress on features  Dim Sum Funeral, The Thaw, Paradox, the CBC's miniseries Dragon Boys, War, and two Douglas Coupland written projects: Everything's Gone Green and, more recently, the 2008 TV series jPod.

Song is currently represented by Echelon Talent Management Inc.

She portrayed the character of Roulette on The CW's Smallville.

Honours

 Voted "Number 1 Sexiest in the World" by FHM in Asia 2006.
 Leo Award nomination in 2009 for "Dim Sum Funeral" - Best performance by a leading actress in a feature film.
 Leo Award nomination in 2008 for jPod - Best performance by a supporting actress in a dramatic series.
 Leo Award nomination in 2007 for Dragon Boys - Best performance by a leading actress in a dramatic series.
 Gemini Award nomination in 2007 for Dragon Boys - Best performance by a leading actress in a dramatic series.
 Leo Award nomination in 2006 for Everything's Gone Green - Best performance by a leading actress in a feature film.

Filmography

Film
{|class="wikitable"
! colspan=4 style="background:#B0C4DE;" | Film
|-
! style="background: #CCCCCC;" | Year
! style="background: #CCCCCC;" | Title
! style="background: #CCCCCC;" | Role
! style="background: #CCCCCC;" | Notes
|-
| 2002
| Guru Wayne
| Production Assistant
| Credited as Stephanie Song
|-
| 2003
| The Long Lunch
| Gracie
|
|-
| 2004
| Rice Rhapsody
| Jennifer
| Original title: Hainan ji fan Also known as: Hainan Chicken Rice
|-
| 2006
| Everything's Gone Green
| Ming Yu
|
|-
| 2007
| War
| Diane Lone
|
|-
| rowspan=2|2008
| Dim Sum Funeral
| Meimei
|
|-
| Waiting in Beijing
| Judy
| Credited as Li Ching Song
|-
| 2009
| The Thaw
| Ling Chen
|-
| rowspan=2|2010
| Paradox
| Lenore
|
|-
| Stained
| Chloe
|
|-
| 2012
| Maximum Conviction
| Samantha
|
|-
| 2017
| Outsiders
| Renee
|
|-
| 2018
| Affection
| Laina
| Short film
|-
| 2021
| Mixtape
| Ellen's mother
|
|}

Television

Video games

References

External links
Official website

2009 Interview on Toro Magazine''

1984 births
Australian film actresses
Australian television actresses
Australian people of Chinese descent
Canadian actresses of Malaysian descent
Canadian film actresses
Canadian television actresses
Living people
Malaysian actresses
Malaysian people of Chinese descent
Malaysian emigrants to Canada
Malaysian emigrants to Australia
Canadian actresses of Chinese descent
Actresses from Saskatoon
Australian actresses of Asian descent